Muzadi is a surname. Notable people with the surname include:

 Hasyim Muzadi (1944–2017), Indonesian politician
 Victor Muzadi (born 1978), Angolan basketball player